Deokinandan Narayan was an Indian politician. He was a Member of Parliament  representing Maharashtra in the Rajya Sabha the upper house of India's Parliament as member  of the  Indian National Congress.

References

Rajya Sabha members from Maharashtra
Indian National Congress politicians
1985 deaths
1899 births
Indian National Congress politicians from Maharashtra